BCLP may refer to:

British Columbia Liberal Party
Bryan Cave Leighton Paisner, law firm